Marty Jertson (born August 24, 1980) is an American professional golfer. 

Jertson was born in Gallup, New Mexico. He played college golf at the Colorado School of Mines where he was an All-American in 2002. He turned professional in 2002.

Jertson is a member of the Southwest section of the PGA of America, which contains Arizona and Clark County, Nevada. He is the Director of Product Development for Ping, is credited with the design of many of the company's golf clubs, and is listed on over 125 patents. As a golf equipment manufacturer, Jertson is classified as an A-19 member.

Jertson finished 82nd at the 2019 PGA Championship, last of those who made the cut. It was his fourth time playing in the tournament. He has also played multiple times in the Shriners Hospitals for Children Open as winner of a qualifier for Southwest PGA professionals.

Professional wins
2008 Southwest PGA Assistant Championship
2010 Southwest PGA Professional Championship

Source:

Results in major championships
Results not in chronological order in 2020.

CUT = missed the half-way cut 
NT = No tournament due to COVID-19 pandemic

U.S. national team appearances
PGA Cup: 2011 (winners), 2019 (winners)

References

External links

American male golfers
Golfers from New Mexico
Golfers from Phoenix, Arizona
Colorado Mines Orediggers athletes
People from Gallup, New Mexico
1980 births
Living people